The Governor of Tierra del Fuego, Antarctica and South Atlantic Islands is the highest executive officer of the Argentine province of Tierra del Fuego. The Governor is directly elected by the people of the province for a four-year term. A Vice Governor (vicegobernador) is elected at the same time and can assume office in the absence, death or suspension of the Governor. The current governor of Tierra del Fuego is Gustavo Melella, elected in 2019.

The office of Governor was created in 1884, when it was a position appointed by the Government of Argentina. Argentina claims Argentine Antarctica, the Falkland Islands, and South Georgia and the South Sandwich Islands as part of its territory (although these regions are governed as overseas territories of the United Kingdom) and in 1957 they were added to the National Territory of Tierra del Fuego (which became known as Tierra del Fuego, Antarctica and South Atlantic Islands). During the Argentine occupation of the Falkland Islands, the South Atlantic Islands were removed from the jurisdiction of the Government of Tierra del Fuego, although they were officially returned in 1985. On 17 May 1991, Tierra del Fuego became a full-fledged province of the Argentine Republic.

List of governors

Governors of the National Territory of Tierra del Fuego

Governors of Tierra del Fuego Province

See also
Legislature of Tierra del Fuego

References

External links 
World Statesmen

 
Tierra del Fuego|Governors of Tierra